David Lázaro Alonso (born 1 June 1985) is a Spanish footballer who plays as a defensive midfielder.

External links

1985 births
Living people
People from Tudela (comarca)
Spanish footballers
Footballers from Navarre
Association football midfielders
Segunda División players
CA Osasuna B players
UE Lleida players
Villarreal CF B players
CD Castellón footballers
Deportivo Alavés players
UD Salamanca players
CF Badalona players
CD Tudelano footballers